Safu is a village in Iran.

Safu or SAFU may also refer to:
Safu, fictional character in Japanese novel series No. 6
Student Association of Flinders University, former Australian student organisation
South Australian Farmers Union, owners of brand name Farmers Union

People with the surname
Chantal Safu, Democratic Republic of Congo politician